Superdome or Super Dome may refer to:

 Caesars Superdome (formerly the Louisiana Superdome and later Mercedes-Benz Superdome) in New Orleans, Louisiana
 The Sydney Super Dome (formerly Acer Arena) in Sydney, Australia
 The Burswood Superdome; see Crown Perth#Burswood Dome
 HP Superdome server
 Superdome (film), a 1978 ABC television movie
 the "Super Dome (railcar)" built by Pullman-Standard for the Chicago, Milwaukee, St. Paul and Pacific Railroad ("Milwaukee Road")

See also
 Superdrome (disambiguation)